The Campo Elías Municipality is one of the 23 municipalities 

(municipios) that makes up the Venezuelan state of Mérida and according to a 2007 population estimate by the National Institute of Statistics of Venezuela, the municipality has a population of 100,192.  The town of Ejido is the shire town of the Campo Elías Municipality.

Demographics
The Campo Elías Municipality, according to a 2007 population estimate by the National Institute of Statistics of Venezuela, has a population of 100,192 (up from 84,476 in 2000). This amounts to 11.9% of the state's population.

Government
The mayor of the Campo Elías Municipality is Jesús Antonio Abreu Uzcátegui, re-elected on October 31, 2004 with 61% of the vote.  The municipality is divided into seven parishes; Fernández Peña, Matriz, Montalbán, Acequias, Jají, La Mesa, and San José del Sur.

References

Municipalities of Mérida (state)